Bibhudutta Panda (born 14 March 1989) is an Indian cricketer. He is a right-handed opening bowler and lower order batsman. In first class cricket, he plays for Odishain Ranji Trophy and Katak Barabati Tigers in first edition of Odisha Premier League. In 2nd OPL he played for team Dhauli.

References

1989 births
Living people
Indian cricketers
Odisha cricketers
People from Cuttack
Cricketers from Odisha